is a best-selling heroic fantasy novel series by the Japanese author Kaoru Kurimoto, in continuous publication since 1979. A record 100 volumes were originally planned, but the final total stands at 147 volumes and 26 side-story novels, with the last seventeen volumes (+ five side stories) published posthumously. She was working on the 130th volume of Guin Saga up until May 23, 2009, after which point she became too ill to write. After the 100th book in the series was published in 2005, an event to celebrate this was held in Tokyo, with 600 attending. Guin Saga is the longest single-writer's work in the world, with total sales of 30million copies.

The main story of Guin Saga resumed on November 8, 2013, four years after the passing of the original author. Yū Godai published Volume 131 Parro no Ankoku on that date, followed by Yume Yohino's Volume 132 Cylon no Banka in December 2013.

Plot overview
The story centers around a mysterious warrior named Guin, an amnesiac with a leopard mask magically affixed to his head. Remembering nothing but his fighting instincts and the word "Aurra", he confronts a world laden with danger, intrigue, and magic.

Characters

 
The title character is a mysterious warrior with the head of a leopard. He stumbles upon Rinda and Remus being attacked by soldiers and defeats the entire unit single-handedly. He remembers nothing of his past, knowing only his fighting instincts, what he believes is his name, and a word: Aurra. Guin is often put in position where he will suddenly have a skill he doesn't know he has. He understands the language of the Sem.  As of Prisoner of the Lagon, he starts to realize that he really is part of the Destiny reshaping the land. Guin is inhumanly strong and knowledgeable about battle strategies, causing the Mongauli army to fear and respect him as a warrior, as he often will set up battle scenarios and jump into battle himself with inhuman skill.

 
The Crown Princess of Parros and Remus's twin. She is more independent than Remus. While putting up a strong front for her brother, she is just as devastated over the loss of her homeland. She has prophetic abilities, hence her name "Farseer". According to the novels, she's sure to be one of the top beauties of the land. She has a hatred for Lady Amnelis that is suggested in  Warrior in the Wilderness to be partly because they are rivals and opposites in beauty, but mostly because the White Knights that Lady Amnelis commands were responsible for the deaths of her parents. She is a platinum blonde with violet eyes. At the beginning of the story, she is 14.

 
The Crown Prince of Parros and Rinda's twin. Although Remus comes off as less courageous than Rinda, it is also suggested in the novels that he is more realistic and more able to understand others. His caution is derived from observation of others. He also reveals secrets accidentally by just talking too much. He apparently can "sense" his sister, and occasionally hear her thoughts (The Leopard Mask). Remus is bitter about not having the gift of farsight, although it's evident he will have other talents. He is a platinum blonde with violet eyes. At the beginning of the story, he is 14.

 
The father of Rinda and Remus and the King of Parros.

 
A young mercenary without scruples, but who is portrayed sympathetically.  When he was born, he held a jewel in his hand, and a seer predicted that he would one day rule a kingdom and marry the Princess of Light, whom he believes is Rinda. He is nicknamed "The Crimson Mercenary". Istavan is a cunning fellow, and a battle-hardened mercenary by his (approximate) age of 20. He is very mischievous and has a wild sense of humor, finding things outrageously funny. He particularly likes to tease Rinda, and currently has her promise to become Captain of the Holy Guards of Parros, once it is regained. It is implied that he hopes to gain her favor in order to attain her hand in marriage and become a king, even though such a thing is impossible since Rinda must marry someone of noble lineage. He has a sixth-sense about danger, and will often disappear right before a disaster strikes. Although he complains quite a bit, he follows Guin's orders. He is quite proud and overconfident due to the prophecy made after his birth and often attributes random positive events to the fact that he is a future king.

 
The Count of Stafolos Keep who is suffering from a plague that causes flesh to fall off. He is discovered to have been possessed by a ghoul, who requires blood of living things to keep him alive. He passes on with Guin's help when Stafolos falls.

 
A member of the monkey-like Sem barbarian tribe. She was being held captive by the Black Count and was liberated by Guin, Rinda, and Remus.

 
The General of the Mongauli army, the enemies of Parros. She is obsessed with capturing Guin. She even went so far as to find a way to bridge the Kes river and travel into Nospherus, the no-man's land of the Sem to find him. She is considered one of the most beautiful women in the land with her golden hair and green eyes, but has been described as a "Lady of Ice". She also has a small whip on hand that she uses when talking to or lecturing her subordinates. She often involves herself in events seen as too dangerous for a woman of her position with a seemingly overconfident attitude. One that is shattered when Guin easily defeats her in battle and belittles her afterward.

A soldier in the Mongauli army, and known as Gora's Red Lion. He is deeply and obsessively in love with Lady Amnelis, to the point where he kept a lock of her hair that he managed to obtain on his person for quite some time. He is very proud and believes himself to be invincible, and was able to defeat Istavan in single combat. However, in battle he was almost instantaneously knocked aside by Guin twice and told to come back in 20 years.

Series artists
Painted covers and interior illustrations for volumes 1-19 (1979–1984) were done by Naoyuki Kato. Noted artist Yoshitaka Amano then took the reins until vol. 57 (1997), upon which time he was replaced by Jun Suemi. Shinobu Tanno, whose style closely resembles Suemi's, has been the series artist since vol. 88 (2003) until the final 130th book in 2009.

Media

Novels released in English
American publisher Vertical has released the first five volumes, translated into English by known game translator Alexander O. Smith. The English editions have drawn praise comparing the series to The Lord of the Rings and Conan the Barbarian. The novels have also been translated into German, French, Russian, Italian, Korean and Chinese. Vertical has released the first five novels in English, but only the first three in hardback and paperback editions.

Manga
There are two manga based on the Guin Saga. The Guin Saga Manga:The Seven Magi グイン・サーガ七人の魔道師 is based on a gaiden (side-story) from the Guin Saga novels, where Guin is now King of Cheironia and must protect his kingdom from a magical plague. The story was originally published as a novel in 1981 and was adapted to manga, which first volume was released in February 2001. It is illustrated by Kazuaki Yanagisawa, was published in Japan by Media Factory, and has been released in English in three volumes by Vertical.

The other manga is based on the early part of the story and is adapted to manga format by Hajime Sawada, as part of the Jive series , adapting Kurimoto's works to manga form.

Anime

On April 12, 2005, Micott & Basara (Japanese investors) announced plans to create an anime based on Guin Saga. In October 2008 more details surfaced which revealed Atsushi Wakabayashi is directing the anime, while famous video game composer Nobuo Uematsu is creating the score. This is Uematsu's first full soundtrack for an anime, and Wakabayashi's first directing role. Animation production was handled by Satelight and the background art by Studio Easter.
The anime debuted on April 5, 2009. On April 3, 2009 an English-dubbed trailer was posted on the anime's official website. On May 7, 2010, North American anime licensor Sentai Filmworks announced that they have acquired the series. Sentai, along with distributor Section23 Films, released part one of the series on DVD on March 29, 2011. Section23 had previously announced a Blu-ray release, but it has been postponed indefinitely. On May 8, 2012, Sentai Filmworks released a complete Guin Saga BD Set encompassing the entire series.

The anime uses two pieces of theme music.  by Nobuo Uematsu is the series' opening theme, while "Saga~This is my road" by Kanon is the series' ending theme.  The soundtrack, comprising two CDs, was released on June 24, 2009.

The anime adapted the first sixteen volumes of the novels.

Audio CDs
On September 21, 2005, six image albums were released for Guin Saga. There were only 5,000 copies made of each CD. The six CDs were:
 
 
 
 
 
 .

Reception
Berserk creator Kentaro Miura has stated that Guin Saga was a large influence on his work.  The books won the 2010 Seiun Award for long fiction. Science fiction critic Mari Kotani regards Guin as "a hero who lives on the border between man and beast". Erin Finnegan from Pop Shock Culture comments that the book "is absolute torture for the first 100 pages, but suddenly at page 105 it turns good". She also comments that the fight scenes, "although cheesy at times", "are all entertainingly well written". The Seattle Times's Nisi Shawl comments that "the book's intense images and dreamlike simplicity give it an anime air".

Jason Thompson of Otaku USA criticises The Seven Magi for trying to summarise "116 volumes and still going" novel series into a few volumes, which "means a lot of backstory that isn't explained for the casual American reader".   Later, writing for the appendix to Manga: The Complete Guide, he found the English dialogue in the series "captures the retro pulp fantasy style almost to the point of self-parody", describing the art as "macho and grotesque", although finding the background art "flat".  Thompson also found the story was too open at the end. Ian Randal Strock of sfscope.com commends the manga for its "black-and-white pen-and-ink work".

Theron Martin enjoyed the broadening of scope of the series in the second half of the anime.

References

External links
Guin Saga homepage at Vertical Publishing
Guin Saga at the Internet Speculative Fiction Database
Information and covers for all volumes (Japanese) (only main series)
Guin Saga anime website

Ed Chavez podcast

Book series introduced in 1979
1979 novels
2001 manga
2007 manga
Fantasy novel series
Fictional leopards
Heroic fantasy
High fantasy anime and manga
Japanese fantasy novels
Media Factory manga
Satelight
Seinen manga
Sentai Filmworks
Shōnen manga
Sword and sorcery anime and manga
NHK original programming
Vertical (publisher) titles